Fay King may refer to:
 Fay King (American football)
 Fay King (cartoonist)